The Unremarkable Heart and Other Stories is a short story (book) written by Karin Slaughter and published by Mulholland Books (an imprint of Little, Brown and Company owned by Hachette Book Group) on 26 May 2011 which later won the Edgar Award for Best Short Story in 2013.

References 

American short story collections
Thriller short story collections
Edgar Award-winning works
Mulholland Books books
2011 short story collections